Portrait of the Sculptor Jens Adolf Jerichau, the Artist's Husband is a portrait of the Danish sculptor Jens Adolf Jerichau painted in 1846 by Elisabeth Jerichau-Baumann, the same year they married.

Artist 
Elisabeth Jerichau Baumann was a German-speaking, German-educated  female artist. When in 1848, she  came to Copenhagen she had a lot to overcome. She was characterized as an outsider and was not well received in Danish culture, which was more concerned with the continuation of the legacy of the Danish Golden Age as expressed by C. W. Eckersberg and N.L. Høyen.

The portrait was painted in 1846, the same year that Baumann and Jerichau married.

Description 
The portrait shows Jerichau sitting and looking slightly off to the side rather than directly at the viewer. The focus is on the sculptor's hands, the creative hands. In the left hand Jerichau carries  an engagement ring and in the right hand he holds some material probably from the sculpture in the background, a sketch for a breakthrough work of Hercules and Hebe from 1845. The artist shows her husband's mastery of the sculptor tradition.

Provenance 
The painting was given as a gift to the National Gallery of Denmark by brewer JC Jacobsen in 1876 and received after the artist's death in 1881.

Notes

Sources 
 Max Bendixen, Verdensdamen Elisabeth Jerichau-Baumann, 
 Nicolaj Bøgh: Elisabeth Jerichau Baumann, 1886

External links 
 www.smk.dk/udforsk-kunsten/highlights
 www.smk.dk/udforsk-kunsten/kunsthistorier

1846 paintings
Paintings by Elisabeth Jerichau-Baumann
Portraits by Danish artists
Paintings in the collection of the National Gallery of Denmark
19th-century paintings in Denmark